The Laotian giant flying squirrel (Biswamoyopterus laoensis) is an arboreal, flying squirrel endemic to Laos. It was the second described member in the genus Biswamoyopterus, after being first collected in September 2012 by scientists researching the animal corpses in the illegal Thongnami bushmeat market, Ban Thongnami, Pakkading District, Bolikhamxai Province.

Description 
Biswamoyopterus laoensis has reddish, grizzled fur with white above. Its crown is pale grey, its patagium is orangish and its underparts are white.

This is slightly larger than the one other Biswamoyopterus species, B. biswasi, known from a single sample found in India in 1981.

References

Biswamoyopterus
Rodents of Laos
Endemic fauna of Laos
Mammals described in 2013
Species known from a single specimen